Arctocyonidae (from Greek arktos kyôn, "bear/dog-like") has been defined as an extinct family of unspecialized, primitive mammals with more than 20  genera. Animals assigned to this family were most abundant during the Paleocene, but extant from the late Cretaceous to the early Eocene.
Like most early mammals, their actual relationships are very difficult to resolve. No Paleocene fossil has been unambiguously assigned to any living order of placental mammals, and many genera resemble each other: generalized robust, not very agile animals with long tails and all-purpose chewing teeth, living in warm closed-canopy forests with many niches left vacant by the K-T extinction. 

Arctocyonids were early defined as a family of creodonts (early predators), then reassigned to the condylarths (primitive plant-eaters, now understood as a wastebasket taxon). More recently, these animals have been thought to be the ancestors of the orders Mesonychia and Cetartiodactyla, although some morphological studies have suggested that Arctocyonidae is also a wastebasket taxon for basal ungulates, and is in fact polyphyletic.
As of 2015, the largest cladistic study of Paleocene mammals to date supports the idea that the animals in this group are not related, with Arctocyon and Loxolophus sister to pantodonts+periptychids, Goniacodon and Eoconodon sister to carnivores+mesonychids, most other genera allied with creodonts and palaeoryctidans, and Protungulatum not a placental mammal at all. If this analysis holds true, then any "Arctocyonid" characteristics are the result of coincidence (selection by the observer of characteristics shared by many early Tertiary mammals) or convergence (similar habits in life).

Characteristics 
Arctocyonid skulls had large canines and relatively sharp teeth and were thus superficially similar to those of modern carnivores. However, large canines appear as tools for display, intraspecific fighting, and self-defense in many genera that are not predatory (baboons, hippos, antlerless deer), and generalized mammal teeth often have relatively sharp elements. Arctocyonid teeth were not specialized for slicing meat; these animals were probably omnivorous and definitely the least herbivorous of the condylarths. Arctocyonid teeth show much individual variation and, because many members of this family are only known from fossil teeth, the taxonomy of the genera is highly unstable.

Genera assigned to this group had relatively short limbs lacking the specializations associated with ungulates (e.g. reduced side digits, fused bones, and hoofs), and long, heavy tails. Their primitive anatomy makes it unlikely that they were able to run down prey, but with their powerful proportions, claws, and long canines, some genera may have been able to overpower smaller animals in surprise attacks.

Evolutionary variation 
Genera assigned to the arctocyonids were the most common mammals in Europe during the Paleocene. Archaic arctocyonids, such as Prolatidens, have been found in the early Paleocene layers in Hainin, Belgium. The family was expanded to include a wide variety of genera, including Arctocyon (known as/similar to Claenodon in North America), Arctocyonides, Landenodon, and Mentoclaenodon, found in the late Paleocene layers of Cernay, France.

A near-complete skeleton of the North American Chriacus, which in recent analysis nests with the palaeoryctidans near the origin of pangolins, has been found in Wyoming. This small raccoon-like animal had powerful limb muscles and a long, robust, and maybe prehensile tail. Capable of both balancing in a tree and digging, it was adapted to both an arboreal and a terrestrial life.

Larger animals assigned to arctocyonids spent most of their time on the forest floor, but were probably still able to climb trees. Some genera may have partly taken the role of large predators in Paleocene faunas together with groups now considered related, such as the triisodontids and mesonychids, two families traditionally classified as condylarths, but now assigned to the "predatory ungulate" order Mesonychia (which has been defined as a sister group to carnivores).

Large arctocyonids include:

Arctocyon, formerly considered diagnostic for the characteristics of the family, and most recently defined as a relative of periptychids and pantodonts. This robust, bear-sized animal was a plantigrade ungulate with short limbs; its feet had claws and it had a long tail. It had a long skull equipped with a large sagittal crest and large canines, especially the lower ones. It had low-crowned, bunodont molars (i.e. teeth with rounded cusps) similar to modern bears, and it is assumed that they had a similar omnivorous diet. The related subfamily Arctocyonides were smaller and more slender.

Mentoclaenodon was, judging from the scarce material available on the genus, larger than the other two large genera and tended to develop long canines similar to early big cats.

See also 
 Mesonychidae

Notes

References
 

Condylarths
Paleocene mammals
Eocene mammals
Late Cretaceous first appearances
Eocene extinctions
Prehistoric mammal families